= Suliman Gafar Mohamed =

Sudanese footballer

Personal information
- Date of birth: 1947 (age 78–79)

International career
Years	Team	Apps	(Gls)
- Sudan

Suliman Gafar Mohamed (born 1947) is a Sudanese footballer. He competed in the men's tournament at the 1972 Summer Olympics.
